Mattias Ohlin (born 4 February 1978) is a former international freestyle and backstroke swimmer from Sweden, who participated in two consecutive Summer Olympics for his native country, starting in 2000.

Ohlin is best known for winning the gold medal in the men's 4×100 m freestyle at the 2000 FINA Short Course World Championships in Athens, Greece.

References

1978 births
Living people
Swedish male backstroke swimmers
Swimmers at the 2000 Summer Olympics
Swimmers at the 2004 Summer Olympics
Olympic swimmers of Sweden
People from Trelleborg
World record setters in swimming
Swedish male freestyle swimmers
Medalists at the FINA World Swimming Championships (25 m)
European Aquatics Championships medalists in swimming
Trelleborgs SS swimmers
Sportspeople from Skåne County
21st-century Swedish people